Lambda Aquarii, informally known as Hydor, is a variable star in the equatorial constellation of Aquarius. The name is Latinized from the Bayer designation λ Aquarii. The apparent visual magnitude of this star ranges from 3.57 down to 3.80, which is bright enough to be visible with the naked eye. It lies just 0.39 degrees south of the ecliptic and so is subject to lunar occultations. The star is eclipsed by the sun from about 1-4 March; thus the star can be viewed the whole night, crossing the sky, in early September, in the current epoch.

This star is on the asymptotic giant branch and is generating energy through the nuclear fusion of hydrogen and helium along concentric shells surrounding an inert core of carbon and oxygen. With 3.6 times the mass of the Sun, it has expanded to 44 times the Sun's radius. It is classified as slow irregular variable and pulsation periods of 24.5, 32.0, and 49.5 days have been identified. On average, it is radiating nearly 700 times the luminosity of the Sun from the photosphere at an effective temperature of 3,835 K.

Naming

Hydor is from Greek Ὕδωρ "water", a name given by Proclus, according to Richard Hinckley Allen. Another Greek name for the star is Ekkhysis, from εκχυσις "outpouring".

References

External links
 Image Lambda Aquarii
 Named Stars 

M-type giants
Slow irregular variables
Aquarius (constellation)
Aquarii, Lambda
BD-08 0968
Aquarii, 073
216386
112961
8698
Hydor